Necarne Castle, also known as Castle Irvine, is a Victorian castle near Irvinestown in County Fermanagh, Northern Ireland. The two-storey façade was designed by John B. Keane; work began in 1831.

See also
Castles in Northern Ireland

References

Castles in County Fermanagh
Grade B+ listed buildings
Register of Parks, Gardens and Demesnes of Special Historic Interest